Alfred Woodroffe (1 September 1918 – 23 July 1964) was an English cricketer active in first-class cricket from 1947–1948. He played as a left-handed batsman.

Woodroffe made his debut in first-class cricket for Warwickshire against Worcestershire in the 1947 County Championship at Dudley. He made a further appearance in 1947 against Gloucestershire, before making his final two first-class appearances in the 1948 County Championship against Gloucestershire and Surrey. As a middle order batsman, Woodroffe scored a total of 77 runs in his four matches, with a high score of 41.

He died at Sutton Coldfield, Warwickshire on 23 July 1964.

References

External links
Alfred Woodroffe at ESPNcricinfo
Alfred Woodroffe at CricketArchive

`

1918 births
1964 deaths
Sportspeople from West Bromwich
English cricketers
Warwickshire cricketers